Desert Moon is the debut solo album by former Styx keyboard player/singer/songwriter Dennis DeYoung. It was released in 1984 on A&M Records. To date, it has been the most successful of his solo albums and most successful of any of the Styx member solo albums.

The album sold respectably and reached No. 24 on the Billboard 200 album charts in the fall of 1984 and was certified Gold in Canada. The album's biggest hit was its title cut which hit No. 10 on the Billboard singles chart. The album's second single "Don't Wait for Heroes" reached No. 83 and got MTV play. However, the follow up "Dear Darling (I'll Be There)", failed to chart.

Track listing
All songs written by Dennis DeYoung, except where noted:

 "Don't Wait for Heroes" – 4:46
 "Please" – 4:20 (a duet with Rosemary Butler)
 "Boys Will Be Boys" – 5:41
 "Fire" (Jimi Hendrix) – 3:46
 "Desert Moon" – 6:09
 "Suspicious" – 4:57
 "Gravity" – 4:51
 "Dear Darling (I'll Be There)" – 4:27

Personnel
Dennis DeYoung: percussion, piano, arranger, keyboards, lead and background vocals, producer, mixing
Tom Dziallo: acoustic guitar, bass guitar, percussion, arranger, electric guitar, drum programming, mixing
Dennis Johnson: bass guitar
Tom Radtke: drums, percussion
Steve Eisen: conductor, conga, saxophone
Rosemary Butler: duet vocal on "Please"
Sandy Caulfield: background vocals
Suzanne DeYoung, Tom Dziallo, Dawn Feusi, Pat Hurley: additional backing vocals
Vince Guttman: drum programming
Maurice Lynn Simmons: drum programming
Gary Loizzo: background vocals, engineer, drum programming, mixing
Rob Kingsland: engineer, mixing
Ted Jensen: mastering
Jim Popko: engineer, mixing
Bill Rascati: engineer, mixing
Chuck Beeson: art direction, design

Notes 

1984 debut albums
Dennis DeYoung albums
A&M Records albums